Vyacheslav Mykhaylovych Leshchuk (born 24 December 1951 in Bilhorod-Dnistrovskyi) is a retired Ukrainian and Soviet football player.

International career
Leshchuk played his only game for USSR on 20 March 1976 in a friendly against Argentina.

In 1979 Leshchuk played couple of games for Ukraine at the Spartakiad of the Peoples of the USSR.

References

External links
  Profile

1951 births
Living people
People from Bilhorod-Dnistrovskyi
Soviet footballers
Soviet Union international footballers
Ukrainian footballers
FC Chornomorets Odesa players
Ukrainian football chairmen and investors
Association football midfielders
Association football defenders